The Director of the Civilian Planning and Conduct Capability (Dir CPCC) is the head of the European External Action Service's (EEAS) Civilian Planning and Conduct Capability (CPCC) who also serves as Civilian Operations Commander (Civ OpCdr). The Civ OpCdr exercises command and control at strategic level for the operational planning and conduct of all civilian crisis management missions deployed as part of the European Union's (EU) security and defence policy (CSDP). The Civ OpCdr is assisted by number of senior policy experts.

Role within the command and control structure

See also
Director of the Military Planning and Conduct Capability

References

External links

Common Security and Defence Policy bodies of the European External Action Service
European Union military personnel